William FitzGuido, a Londoner, and Prebendary of Clondalkin, was appointed by Archbishop Archbishop Henry de Loundres to be Dean of St Patrick's Cathedral, Dublin  in 1219 and served until 1238.

References

Deans of St. Patrick's Cathedral, Dublin
13th-century Irish Roman Catholic priests
Clergy from London